is a 1971 Japanese film directed by Masaki Kobayashi. The film set during the Tokugawa Shogunate and is about a tavern in Edo which smugglers use as a base of operations. The film was adapted from the novel Fukagawa anarakutei by Shugoro Yamamoto. The film received four awards at the Mainichi Film Concours, including Best Actor and Best Score.

Cast
 Tatsuya Nakadai as Sadahichi
 Komaki Kurihara as Omitsu
 Wakako Sakai as Okiwa
 Kei Yamamoto
 Kei Satō as Yohei
 Shigeru Koyama as Officer Kanedo
 Yūsuke Takita
 Shin Kishida
 Ichirō Nakatani
 Nakamura Kanemon III as Ikuzo
 Shintaro Katsu as the nameless wanderer

Release
Inn of Evil received a roadshow theatrical release in Japan on 11 September 1971 where it was distributed by Toho. It received a general release 16 October 1971.

The film was released theatrically in the United States by Toho International with English subtitles. It was released in March 1972, with a 120-minute running time.

Reception
The film received many awards at the Mainichi Film Concours. These included Shintaro Katsu for Best actor (along with his work in Zatoichi Meets the One-Armed Swordsman and Kitsune no kureta akanbo.) The second was Best Score for Toru Takemitsu (along with his scores for The Ceremony and Silence). The final award were for Best Cinematography and Best Art Direction.

See also
 List of Japanese films of 1971

Footnotes

References

External links
 

Toho films
Films directed by Masaki Kobayashi
Films scored by Toru Takemitsu
Japanese black-and-white films
1970s Japanese films